Jasper Park is a neighbourhood in west Edmonton, Alberta, Canada that was once a part of the Town of Jasper Place.  It became a part of Edmonton when Jasper Place amalgamated with Edmonton in 1964.  It is a smaller residential neighbourhood bounded on the south by 87 Avenue, on the east by 149 Street, on the west by 156 Street, and on the north by 92 Avenue.

Residents have access to shopping.  Not only are there two strip shopping centres in the neighbourhood, Meadowlark Health and Shopping Centre is located immediately to the west in the neighbourhood of Meadowlark Park.  A little farther west is West Edmonton Mall.

The community is represented by the Jasper Park Community League, established in 1951, which maintains a community hall and outdoor rink located at 153 Street and 87 Avenue.

Demographics 

Surrounding neighbourhoods 
Adjacent neighbourhoods are Laurier Heights, Lynnwood, Meadowlark Park, Parkview, and Sherwood.  These are all residential neighbourhoods.

See also 
 Edmonton Federation of Community Leagues

References 

Neighbourhoods in Edmonton